Ulyotovsky District is an administrative district (raion), one of the thirty-one in Zabaykalsky Krai, Russia. It is located in the southwest of the krai, and borders with Khiloksky District in the north, Duldurginsky District in the east, Kyrinsky District in the south, and with Krasnochikoysky District in the west. Its administrative center is the rural locality (a selo) of Ulyoty. Population:  21,337 (2002 Census);  The population of Ulyoty accounts for 32.0% of the district's total population.

History
The district was established on January 4, 1926.

Administrative and municipal status
Within the framework of administrative divisions, Ulyotovsky District is one of the thirty-one in the krai. The selo of Ulyoty serves as its administrative center.

As a municipal division, the territory of the district is split between two municipal formations—Ulyotovsky Municipal District, to which one urban-type settlement and twenty-two of the administrative district's rural localities belong, and Gorny Urban Okrug, which covers the rest of the administrative district's territory, including the urban-type settlement of Gorny.

References

Notes

Sources

Districts of Zabaykalsky Krai
States and territories established in 1926